The 2003 PlaceMakers V8 International was the twelfth round of the 2003 V8 Supercar Championship Series. It was held on the weekend of 7 to 9 November at Pukekohe Park Raceway in New Zealand.

Race results

Qualifying 

In practice, Jason Richards was involved in a crash which saw his car roll several times, forcing him out of the weekend.

Top Ten Shootout 
Results from the Top Ten Shootout were discounted due to the changing conditions throughout the session. Grid results were reverted to provisional qualifying.

Race 1

Race 2

Race 3

External links
 PlaceMakers V8 Supercars website

Placemakers
Auto races in New Zealand
Place
November 2003 sports events in New Zealand